Tuomo is a male given name common in Finland. It is a Finnish version of the name Thomas. Common variations of Tuomo in Finland include Tuomas, Toomas, Tomas and Thoma. The nameday is the 21st of December. As of 2013 there are more than 16,000 people with this name in Finland.

People
Some notable people who have this name include:
 Tuomo Könönen (born 1977), Finnish football (soccer) player
 Tuomo Lassila (born 1965), Finnish musician 
 Tuomo Mannermaa, Finnish theologist
 Tuomo Prättälä (born 1979), Finnish soul and jazz musician, also known by the mononym Tuomo
 Tuomo Polvinen (born 1931), Finnish historian
 Tuomo Puumala (born 1982), Finnish politician
 Tuomo Ruutu (born 1983), Finnish professional ice hockey forward 
 Tuomo Tuormaa (1926-2010), Finnish sprint canoer
 Tuomo Turunen (born 1987), Finnish footballer
 Tuomo Ylipulli (1965–2021), Finnish ski jumper

Places
Tuomo Town

References

See also
 Tuomas

Finnish masculine given names